No Distance Left to Run is a documentary film about the British rock band Blur, released in cinemas on 19 January 2010. Following the band during their 2009 reunion and tour, the film also includes unseen archive footage and interviews. It was released on DVD on 15 February 2010 region free and the recording of the 2009 Hyde Park concert is included on a second disc.
It aired on BBC2 on 14 March 2010. It is the band's second documentary video, following Starshaped seventeen years before in 1993.

Track listing

DVD one
No Distance Left to Run

No Distance Left to Run (the film)
Theatrical trailer

DVD two
Live at Hyde Park (filmed 2 July 2009)

"Intro"
"She's So High"
"Girls & Boys"
"Tracy Jacks"
"There's No Other Way"
"Jubilee"
"Badhead"
"Beetlebum"
"Out of Time"
"Trimm Trabb"
"Coffee & TV"
"Tender"
"Country House"
"Oily Water"
"Chemical World"
"Sunday Sunday"
"Parklife"
"End of a Century"
"To the End"
"This Is a Low"
"Popscene"
"Advert"
"Song 2"
"Death of a Party"
"For Tomorrow"
"The Universal"

Reception
The film received mostly positive reviews from critics. Review aggregator Rotten Tomatoes reports a 93% approval rating, based on 14 reviews.

Awards

In December 2010, No Distance Left to Run was nominated as Best Long Form Music Video for the 53rd Grammy Awards. The situation was unique because this was the first time when Blur were up for a Grammy Award. Eventually they lost out to a documentary about The Doors, When You're Strange.

References

External links

Press release from Arts Alliance Media website
Information from EMI website

2010 films
British documentary films
Rockumentaries
2010 documentary films
2010s English-language films
2010s British films
English-language documentary films